Umal Irandika (born 11 November 1980) is a Sri Lankan cricketer. He played 29 first-class and 20 List A matches between 1999 and 2009. He was also part of Sri Lanka's squad for the 2000 Under-19 Cricket World Cup.

References

External links
 

1980 births
Living people
Sri Lankan cricketers
Colts Cricket Club cricketers
Galle Cricket Club cricketers
Kurunegala Youth Cricket Club cricketers
Sebastianites Cricket and Athletic Club cricketers
Sri Lanka Air Force Sports Club cricketers
Tamil Union Cricket and Athletic Club cricketers
Cricketers from Galle